The Women's 75 kg weightlifting event took place on 29 July at 15:30. The event took place at the Clyde Auditorium.

Result
The final results:

References

Weightlifting at the 2014 Commonwealth Games
Common